Patrick Quinn (20 March 1904–4 December 1976) was an Irish police officer (Garda 1700), and a recipient of the Scott Medal.

A native of Mountgordon, Castlebar, County Mayo, Quinn joined the Garda Síochána on 1 June 1922. Following a report of an alleged kidnapping, he and two colleagues, Timothy Mahony (Garda 2376) and Laurence Neill (Garda 5357), used their Chief Superintendent's car to pursue two suspicious-looking men. The arrival of the three Gardaí alarmed the two men, who reached into their pockets. A fight ensued as Gardaí Mahony and Neill strove to prevent the two men from using their weapons (the officers being unarmed as is the usual custom for Gardaí). As Garda Quinn came to their aid, the two men were overcome but Quinn narrowly avoided being shot as a gun went off. The apprehended men had approached Balbriggan Station in pursuit of their kidnap victim, a Mr Finnegan, with the intention of using their loaded guns to recapture him.

Quinn was later transferred to the Longford/Westmeath Division, being promoted to sergeant in July 1936. He and his two colleagues were awarded their Scott Medals at the Garda Depot, Dublin, on 25 August 1935. He retired on 19 March 1967.

References

 An Garda Síochána and the Scott Medal, pp. 46–48, Gerard O'Brien, Four Courts Press, Dublin, 2008. 

People from County Mayo
1976 deaths
Garda Síochána officers
Recipients of the Scott Medal
1904 births